Zheng Xiulin (born 1966) is a Chinese former basketball player who competed in the 1992 Summer Olympics and in the 1996 Summer Olympics.

References

1966 births
Living people
Chinese women's basketball players
Olympic basketball players of China
Olympic medalists in basketball
Olympic silver medalists for China
Medalists at the 1992 Summer Olympics
Basketball players at the 1992 Summer Olympics
Chinese women's basketball coaches